The XYY Man began as a series of novels by Kenneth Royce, featuring the character of William (or Willie) 'Spider' Scott, a one-time cat-burglar who leaves prison aiming to go straight but finds his talents still to be very much in demand by both the criminal underworld and the British secret service. Scott has an extra Y chromosome that supposedly gives him a criminal predisposition – although he tries to go straight, he is genetically incapable of doing so.

Royce's original books were: The XYY Man (1970); Concrete Boot (1971); The Miniatures Frame (1972); Spider Underground (The Masterpiece Affair) (1973) and Trap Spider (1974), though he returned to the character in the 80s with The Crypto Man (1984) and The Mosley Receipt (1985).

Regular characters included Scott's long-suffering girlfriend Maggie Parsons; British secret service head codenamed Fairfax (the character's real name is Sir Stuart Halliman. In one episode, Fairfax identifies himself as 'Stuart' in a telephone conversation); Detective Sergeant George Bulman, the tenacious policeman who wants to see Scott back behind bars; journalist Ray Lynch; gay photographer Bluey Palmer; and KGB chief Kransouski.

The XYY Man — The TV Series

In 1976 the first of Royce's novels was adapted for British television by Ivor Marshall. The series ran for three episodes, which covered the one storyline with Stephen Yardley starring as the main character. Co-starring were Mark Dignam as shadowy civil-servant and MI5 officer Fairfax, Don Henderson as his nemesis DS George Bulman, and Dennis Blanch as Bulman's assistant, DC Derek Willis. The series, produced by Granada Television, was successful enough for a second series of ten episodes, containing original stories written for television, to follow in 1977. Both series were released as a complete box set via the Network imprint on 26 February 2007.

Although the television adaptation openly depicts a person with XYY syndrome as having criminal tendencies, it was highlighted following the series' broadcast that in real life, there is no connection. An early academic paper studying the conditional probability fallacy resulted in the myth becoming conventional wisdom in the 1970s, but subsequent research has not found any evidence for it. The subject was also touched on in an episode of Doomwatch, "By the Pricking of My Thumbs...", written by Robin Chapman.

When the series came to an end, the characters of Bulman and Willis were considered popular enough to merit their own spin-off series, Strangers, which followed in 1978. Five series of Strangers were broadcast, before a second and final spin-off series, Bulman, followed in 1985. The popularity of the character of Bulman resulted in Kenneth Royce writing three further novels featuring the character: No Way Back (Hashimi's Revenge) in 1986, and later The Judas Trail (1996) and Shadows (1996).

Cast
 Stephen Yardley as William 'Spider' Scott
 Don Henderson as DS George Bulman
 Dennis Blanch as DC Derek Willis 
 Vivienne McKee as Maggie Parsons
 Mark Dignam as Fairfax (Series 1 & Series 2, Episodes 4—8)
 Oliver Maguire as Don Stevens (Series 2, Episodes 1—5 & 9)
 Johnny Shannon as Warren (Series 1, Episode 1 & Series 2, Episodes 1—4)
 Brian Croucher as Raisen (Series 2, Episodes 1—4)
 Fiona Curzon as Penny (Series 2, Episodes 1—4)
 William Squire as Laidlaw (Series 2, Episodes 1—4)

Episodes

Series 1 (1976)

Series 2 (1977)

References

External links
 

1976 British television series debuts
1977 British television series endings
1970s British drama television series
1970s British crime television series
ITV television dramas
British thriller television series
Television shows based on British novels
English-language television shows
Television series by ITV Studios
Television shows produced by Granada Television